The UK Indie Chart is a weekly chart that ranks the biggest-selling singles that are released on independent record labels in the United Kingdom. The chart is compiled by the Official Charts Company, and is based on both physical and digital single sales. During 2005, at least 28 singles reached number one.

The biggest-selling indie hit of 2005 was "Axel F" by Crazy Frog, which sold more than 525,000 copies by the end of the year and topped the UK Singles Chart for four consecutive weeks. Other high-selling indie hits included "JCB" by Nizlopi, which sold over 295,000 singles despite being available for only 20 days, and "I Bet You Look Good on the Dancefloor", the debut single from Arctic Monkeys, which sold over 174,000 copies and reached number one on the UK Singles Chart in its first week of release.

At least six acts managed to top the UK Indie Chart with two different singles. They were: The Killers, Uniting Nations, The Rakes, Bloc Party, Paul Weller and Babyshambles. Kaiser Chiefs and Feeder were the only acts to reach number one with three different singles each.

Chart history

See also
List of UK Dance Singles Chart number ones of 2005
List of UK Dance Albums Chart number ones of 2005
List of UK Singles Downloads Chart number ones of the 2000s
List of UK Rock & Metal Singles Chart number ones of 2005
List of UK Singles Chart number ones of the 2000s

References

External links
Independent Singles Chart at the Official Charts Company
UK Top 30 Indie Singles Chart at BBC Radio 1

2005 in British music
United Kingdom Indie Singles
Incomplete lists from November 2010
Indie 2005